Mangaone River  may refer to:

Mangaone River (Hawke's Bay), a river of the Hawke's Bay Region of New Zealand
Mangaone River (Manawatu-Wanganui),  a river of the south of New Zealand's North Island

See also 
 Manganui River (disambiguation)
 Mangapapa River (disambiguation)